Live Chronicles is a 1986 album by Hawkwind recorded of a live performance of their The Chronicle of the Black Sword concept album based on the Michael Moorcock character Elric of Melniboné.

Overview
The original album release lacked "Assault and Battery" and "Sleep of a Thousand Tears" as they had been licensed to Flicknife records for single b-sides, and the Michael Moorcock spoken pieces due to Moorcock being in dispute with GWR owner Douglas Smith.

Track listing

Original version
"Song of the Swords" (Dave Brock) – 3:13
"Dragons and Fables" (Huw Lloyd-Langton) – 3:11
"Narration" (Harvey Bainbridge) – 0:47
"The Sea King" (H. Lloyd-Langton) – 3:47
"Angels of Death" (Brock) – 4:43
"Shade Gate" (Bainbridge) – 3:54
"Rocky Paths" (H. Lloyd-Langton, Marion Lloyd-Langton) – 2:51
"Narration - Elric The Enchanter (Part 1)" (Brock) –0:37
"The Pulsing Cavern" (Bainbridge, Alan Davey) – 2:32
"Master of the Universe" (Brock, Nik Turner) – 3:57
"Dreaming City" (H. Lloyd-Langton, M. Lloyd-Langton ) – 4:18
"Choose Your Masques" (Brock, Michael Moorcock) – 4:55
"Fight Sequence" (Bainbridge, Brock) – 3:21
"Needle Gun" (Brock) – 4:10
"Zarozinia" (Brock, Kris Tait) – 4:15
"Lords of Chaos" (Bainbridge, Brock) – 1:00
"The Dark Lords" (Bainbridge, Brock) – 1:36
"Wizards of Pan Tang" (Bainbridge, Brock, Davey, Lloyd-Langton, Danny Thompson) – 1:46
"Moonglum" (H. Lloyd-Langton) – 4:44
"Elric the Enchanter (Part 2)" (Davey) – 2:33
"Conjuration of Magnu" (Brock) – 1:48
"Magnu" (Brock) – 3:16
"Dust of Time" (Bainbridge, Brock, H. Lloyd-Langton) – 2:29
"Horn of Fate" (Brock) – 6:27

Castle CD bonus tracks
"Magnu" (Brock) – 3:10 - from Hawkwind Anthology
"Quark, Strangeness and Charm" (Robert Calvert, Brock) – 2:35 - from Hawkwind Anthology
"Spirit of the Age" (Calvert, Brock) – 7:45 - from Live Seventy Nine
"Who's Gonna Win the War" (Brock) – 4:47 - from Levitation
"Ghost Dance" (Bainbridge, Turner) – 5:34 - from Hawkwind Anthology
"Master of the Universe" (Brock, Turner) – 3:54 - from Live Chronicles
"Choose Your Masques" (Brock, Moorcock) – 4:52 - from Live Chronicles
"Lost Chronicles" (Bainbridge) / "Neon Skyline" (Davey) – 5:21 - from The Xenon Codex
"Tides" (H. Lloyd-Langton) – 2:53 - from The Xenon Codex
"Wings" (Davey) – 5:22 - from Space Bandits
"Lives of Great Men" [a.k.a. "Assault And Battery"] (Brock) – 3:26 - from Palace Springs
"Void of Golden Light" [a.k.a. "Golden Void"] (Brock) – 6:48 - from Palace Springs
"Techno Tropic Zone Exists" (Brock) – 4:31 - from It is the Business of the Future to be Dangerous
"Gimme Shelter" (Mick Jagger, Keith Richards) – 5:38 - from It is the Business of the Future to be Dangerous

Griffin and Atomhenge versions
CD1
"The Chronicle of the Black Sword" (Michael Moorcock) - 1.52
"Song of the Swords" (Brock) - 3:09
"Dragons and Fables" (H. Lloyd-Langton) - 3:09
"Narration" (Bainbridge) – 0:45
"The Sea King" (H. Lloyd-Langton) – 3:07
"Dead God's Homecoming" (Moorcock) - 1:31
"Angels of Death" (Brock) – 4:42
"The Shade Gate" (Bainbridge) – 3:49
"Rocky Paths" (H. Lloyd-Langton, Marion Lloyd-Langton) – 2:52
"Narration - Elric The Enchanter (Part 1)" (Brock) –0:55
"The Pulsing Cavern" (Bainbridge, Davey) – 2:14
"Master of the Universe" (Brock, Turner) – 4:00
"Dragon Song" (Moorcock) - 1:32
"Dreaming City" (H. Lloyd-Langton, M. Lloyd-Langton) – 4:29
"Choose Your Masques" (Brock, Moorcock) – 4:51
"Fight Sequence" (Bainbridge, Brock) – 3:25
CD2
"Assault and Battery" (Brock) - 3:40
"Sleep of a Thousand Tears" (Brock, Moorcock) - 4:37
"Zarozinia" (Brock, Tait) – 4:16
"Lords of Chaos" (Bainbridge, Brock) – 1:00
"The Dark Lords" (Bainbridge, Brock) – 1:37
"Wizards of Pan Tang" (Bainbridge, Brock, Davey, H. Lloyd-Langton, Thompson) - 1:41
"Moonglum" (H. Lloyd-Langton, M. Lloyd-Langton) – 4:40
"Elric the Enchanter (Part 2)" (Davey) – 2:26
"Needle Gun" (Brock) – 4:07
"Conjuration of Magnu" (Brock) – 1:52
"Magnu" (Brock) – 3:16
"Dust of Time" (Bainbridge, Brock, H. Lloyd-Langton) – 2:30
"Horn of Fate (Destiny)" (Brock) – 6:39

Personnel
Hawkwind
Dave Brock – electric guitar, keyboards, vocals
Huw Lloyd-Langton – electric guitar, vocals
Harvey Bainbridge – keyboards, vocals
Alan Davey – bass guitar, vocals
Danny Thompson Jr – drums
with
Michael Moorcock – vocals
Tony Crerar – mime & dance
Kris Tait – mime & dance, vocals
Tim Pollard – mime

Release history
Nov 1986: GWR, GWSP1, UK vinyl
Feb 1994: Griffin Music, GCDHA0136-2, USA 2CD includes reprint of Michael Moorcocks Elric novel "The Dreaming City".
Aug 1998: Castle Communications, CCSCD829, UK 2CD with bonus tracks
January 2009: Atomhenge (Cherry Red) Records, ATOMCD2007, UK CD

References

External links
Atomhenge Records

Hawkwind live albums
1986 live albums
Albums recorded at the Hammersmith Apollo